A caliphate is an Islamic state ruled by a caliph.

Caliphate may also refer to:

Caliphate (TV series), a Swedish drama television series
Caliphate (podcast), a podcast produced by The New York Times
The Caliphate (book), by William Muir

See also
Caliph (disambiguation)